Lim Jung-woo (born January 20, 1978) is a field hockey player from South Korea, who was a member of the Men's National Team that won the silver medal at the 2000 Summer Olympics in Sydney. In the final the Asians lost to title holders the Netherlands after penalty strokes. Lim, a student physical education on the Korea National University, also competed at the 2004 Summer Olympics in Athens.

External links

 Profile on Athens 2004 Web Site 
 
 

1978 births
Living people
South Korean male field hockey players
Olympic field hockey players of South Korea
Field hockey players at the 2000 Summer Olympics
Field hockey players at the 2004 Summer Olympics
Olympic silver medalists for South Korea
Olympic medalists in field hockey
Medalists at the 2000 Summer Olympics
Korea National Sport University alumni
Asian Games medalists in field hockey
Field hockey players at the 1998 Asian Games
Asian Games silver medalists for South Korea
Medalists at the 1998 Asian Games
Academic staff of Korea National Sport University
2002 Men's Hockey World Cup players